Whickham Football Club are an English football club based in Whickham, Tyne and Wear, playing in the Northern League Division One in the English football league system. They won the FA Vase in 1981.

The team plays its home matches at the Glebe Sports Ground, Rose Avenue, Whickham.

History
Founded in 1944 as Axwell Park Colliery Welfare, the club first started playing in the Derwent Valley League. In 1974, they joined the Wearside League, and were league champions in two seasons, 1977–78 and 1987–88. The year 1981 was one of the most successful years in the club's history, when they beat Willenhall Town 3–2 in the final, after going 0–2 down, to win the FA Vase. At the start of 1988–89, they moved up to the Northern League Division Two. The first season saw them finishing third in the league, and they were promoted to Division One. 1991–92 saw them relegated back to Division Two. In 1995, they were promoted again, as league champions, but after relegation in 1997, spent 20 seasons in Division Two, winning promotion back to Northern League 1 in 2017-18

By far the best run in the FA Cup for Whickham came during the 2003–04 season. In that season they won 3-0 at Garforth Town, 2-1 at Hebburn Town (in a replay), 2-1 at home to Armthorpe Welfare (again after a replay) before accumulating a 5-0 defeat at the hands of Chorley in the 2nd Qualifying Round.

In their first season back in Northern League Division One in 2018–19, it was a difficult campaign for the Lang Jacks, who finished with just enough points to remain in the Division.

In the 2021-22 Season a slow start to the campaign was halted with the appointment of Tony Fawcett and some new faces to the squad and the resurgent Lang Jack's marched up the Northern League 1 table finishing in a club record 7th position.

Squad

Management
Updated 1 November 2020.

Manager: Lee Haldane
Assistant Managers: Barrie Smith, Paul Wardle
Physio: Emily Robertson

Committee

Notable former players
Matty Pattison, former Newcastle United, Norwich and South Africa International
Richard Brodie, currently coach at North West Counties League club Ashton Athletic
 David Rayner Now retired and runs his own sports business in New Zealand.

Honours
Ernest Armstrong Memorial Cup
Winners 2006–07
Durham Challenge Cup
Winners 2005–06
FA Vase
Winners 1980–81
Wearside League Cup
Winners 1986–87
Wearside League
Winners 1977–78
Northern Combination
Winners 1969–70, 1972–73, 1973–74
Northern Combination League Cup
Winners 1960–61, 1973–74
Northern League Division Two
Champions 1994–95
Vaux Challenge Cup
Winners 1986–87

Records
Best league performance: 1st in Wearside League, 1977–78, 1987–88; 7th in Northern League Division 1, 2021-22; 1st in Northern League Division Two, 1994–95
Best FA Cup performance: 2nd Round Qualifying, 1995–96, 2003–04
Best FA Trophy performance: 1st Round Qualifying, 1990–91, 1991–92
Best FA Vase performance: Winners 1980–81

External links
Official website
 

Football clubs in England
Football clubs in Tyne and Wear
Association football clubs established in 1944
1944 establishments in England
Wearside Football League
Northern Football League